George Goodale may refer to:

 George Lincoln Goodale (1839–1923), American botanist 
 George Pomeroy Goodale (1843–1919), drama editor of The Detroit Free Press